Narsingi is a village in Medak district in the Indian state of Telangana.

Geography
It has an average elevation of 529 metres (1735 feet).

References

Villages in Medak district